The Cleveland Caps were an American soccer team that played in Cleveland, Ohio.

Year-by-year

Defunct soccer clubs in Ohio
Soccer clubs in Cleveland
Soccer clubs in Ohio
USL Second Division teams
1997 establishments in Ohio
1998 disestablishments in Ohio
Association football clubs established in 1997
Association football clubs disestablished in 1998